Orthetrum chrysostigma, the epaulet skimmer, is a species of dragonfly in the family Libellulidae. It is found in Algeria, Angola, Benin, Botswana, Burkina Faso, Cameroon, Central African Republic, Chad, the Democratic Republic of the Congo, Ivory Coast, Egypt, Equatorial Guinea, Ethiopia, Gambia, Ghana, Guinea, Kenya, Liberia, Libya, Malawi, Mali, Mauritania, Morocco, Mozambique, Namibia, Niger, Nigeria, Senegal, Sierra Leone, Somalia, South Africa, Sudan, Tanzania, Togo, Uganda, Zambia, Zimbabwe, and possibly Burundi as well as Canary Islands, Israel, and Portugal. It was recorded in the Maltese Islands in 2010. One was also spotted in Tel Aviv, Israel in August 2022.

Its natural habitats are subtropical or tropical moist lowland forests, dry savanna, moist savanna, subtropical or tropical dry shrubland, subtropical or tropical moist shrubland, rivers, intermittent rivers, shrub-dominated wetlands, swamps, freshwater lakes, intermittent freshwater lakes, freshwater marshes, intermittent freshwater marshes, and freshwater springs. The adults prey on various flying insects. The bodies of adult males are blue, and those of young and females are yellow and brown.

References

GAUCI, C. & SCIBERRAS, A. (2010) First Records of Orthetrum chrysostigma (Odonata:Libellulidae) Burmeister, 1839 in the Maltese Islands. Central Mediterranean Naturalist 5(2):78-80. Nature Trust Malta publications.

External links

 Orthetrum chrysostigma on African Dragonflies and Damselflies Online

Libellulidae
Insects described in 1839
Taxonomy articles created by Polbot